= Panthadikkaam! =

Upcoming Indian Malayalam-language docu-series

- Genre: Documentary
- Written by: Geethartha AR
- Directed by: Nyx Lopez
- Starring: Vysakh Perambra
- Voices of: Mammootty
- Composer: Nyx Lopez
- Country of origin: India
- Original language: Malayalam
- No. of episodes: 5

Production
- Producer: Sangeetha Janachandran
- Cinematography: Joe Christo Xavier
- Editor: Sajeesh Swaminathan
- Production company: Stories Social

Original release
- Network: Zee 5
- Release: October 1, 2026

Panthadikkaam! is an Indian Malayalam-language docu-series produced by Stories Social for Zee 5. It was released on 1 October 2026 and is structured around the 2026 FIFA World Cup. The series follows the amputee footballer Vysakh Perambra as he travels across Kerala to examine the state's football culture, with narration by the actor Mammootty.

== Premise ==
The series is presented as a journey by Vysakh Perambra, captain of the Indian amputee football team, through towns and villages in Kerala during the 2026 FIFA World Cup, tracing how the sport grew from a pastime followed through newspapers and radio into a fixture of everyday life in the state. Individual episodes take up subjects including a rivalry between supporters of Brazil and Argentina in a single village, the closing stretch of the careers of players such as Lionel Messi, Cristiano Ronaldo and Neymar, and the fan culture, wagers and local businesses that build up around the tournament in Kerala.

== Cast ==
- Vysakh Perambra as himself, host
- Mammootty as narrator

== Release ==
Panthadikkaam! premiered on Zee 5 on 1 October 2026, alongside the start of the 2026 FIFA World Cup.
